James Bay is a large body of water on the southern end of  the Hudson Bay in Canada.

James Bay may also refer to:

 Baie-James, a former municipality in Canada

 James Bay Project, a hydroelectric power initiative in Quebec, Canada
 James Bay, Greater Victoria, a neighbourhood of Victoria, British Columbia, Canada
 James Bay (singer) (born 1990), English singer-songwriter
 , a Royal Canadian Navy minesweeper

See also

 James (disambiguation)
 Bay (disambiguation)
 

Bay, James